Zoran Klemenčič (born 28 April 1976 in Ljubljana) is a Slovenian former professional road cyclist.

Major results

1996
 1st Stage 6 Tour of Slovenia
 4th Trofeo Città di Castelfidardo
1997
 1st Stage 7 Okolo Slovenska
1998
 1st  Road race, European Under-23 Road Championships
 1st Stage 3 Settimana Ciclistica Lombarda
 1st Stage 8 Tour of Yugoslavia
2000
 8th G.P. Costa degli Etruschi
2001
 1st Poreč Trophy 2
 1st Stage 1 Istrian Spring Trophy
 1st Stage 3a Three Days of De Panne
 9th Grand Prix Cerami
2002
 5th Road race, UCI Road World Championships
2004
 1st Prologue & Stage 3 Istrian Spring Trophy
2006
 4th Poreč Trophy

References

External links

1976 births
Living people
Slovenian male cyclists
Sportspeople from Ljubljana